The Crescent Star Party (AYP) is a Kemalist and nationalist political party in Turkey. It was founded on 3 September 2003. The party's name comes from national symbols crescent and star on Turkish flag.

References

External links

2003 establishments in Turkey
Centrist parties in Turkey
Kemalist political parties
Political parties established in 2003
Political parties in Turkey